Björn Hertl (born 10 August 1976 in Miltenberg) is a German football player. He spent two seasons in the Bundesliga with SpVgg Unterhaching.

References

External links
 

1976 births
Living people
People from Miltenberg
Sportspeople from Lower Franconia
German footballers
SpVgg Unterhaching players
SV Wacker Burghausen players
Bundesliga players
2. Bundesliga players
3. Liga players
Association football midfielders
Footballers from Bavaria
SpVgg Unterhaching II players
TSV Buchbach players